The National Society of Film Critics Award for Best Director is an annual award given by National Society of Film Critics to honor the best film director of the year.

Winners

1960s

1970s

1980s

1990s

2000s

2010s

2020s

Multiple winners

3 wins
Ingmar Bergman (1967, 1968, 1970)
Martin Scorsese (1976, 1980, 1990)

2 wins
Robert Altman (1975, 2001)
Luis Buñuel (1972, 1977)
David Cronenberg (1991, 2005)
Clint Eastwood (1992, 2003)
Greta Gerwig (2017, 2019)
Mike Leigh (1999, 2008)
Terrence Malick (1978, 2011)
Steven Soderbergh (1998, 2000)
Steven Spielberg (1982, 1993)
François Truffaut (1969, 1973)

References

Awards for best director